Bulbbul is a 2020 Indian Hindi-language supernatural thriller, written and directed by Anvita Dutt. It was produced by Anushka Sharma and Karnesh Ssharma under Clean Slate Filmz
 and starred Tripti Dimri in the lead role alongside Avinash Tiwary, Paoli Dam, Rahul Bose and Parambrata Chattopadhyay. Tripti Dimri was praised in many reviews. Set against a backdrop of the 1880s Bengal presidency, the film revolves around a child-bride and her journey from innocence to strength. Bulbbul was released on Netflix on 24 June 2020.

Plot 
The story starts in the nineteenth century in a village in Bengal Presidency. Bulbbul is married off to Indranil, the Bado Thakur (Elder Lord), when she is barely five years old. She is close with Satya, Indranil's youngest brother, who is closer to her age. Bulbbul and Satya grow up together, playing and telling each other stories of a demon woman ("chudail"). Indranil's mentally challenged twin brother Mahendra shows a strange appeal toward Bulbbul.

Twenty years later, Satya returns home from London. In the interim Mahendra was killed in what was believed to be a chudail's attack. His widow Binodini now lives in an outhouse. Indranil has left the village and Bulbbul has taken over his responsibilities. The village doctor, Sudip, regularly visits to check Bulbbul's feet due to an undisclosed incident Bulbbul refuses to discuss. Their closeness raises doubts in Satya about Sudip and Bulbbul's relation. While on a hunt, a man is killed; the incident is attributed to the chudail. Satya, however, suspects Sudip. Meanwhile, Bulbbul is informed by a village boy, whose family previously visited the estate to discuss the matter of his father’s second marriage, that his mother had committed suicide after her husband chose his second wife over her, causing Bulbbul to seek the man out.

In flashbacks, it is revealed that Binodini had been jealous of Indranil and Bulbbul's marriage, and  had repeatedly hinted to Indranil that Bulbbul had feelings for Satya. With his mind poisoned, Indranil sends Satya to London to separate those two. Bulbbul and Satya had been working so far on a story together, the manuscript of which Satya hands over to her before leaving for London. Heartbroken, she throws the manuscript into the fireplace and lights them up. At this time, influenced by Binodini, Indranil goes to Bulbbul's room, happens to take out some of the burning pages. Upon reading them, he becomes positively convinced of Bulbbul's feelings for Satya. Enraged, he beats and mutilates her feet with iron bars. On top of that, while she is bedridden, Mahendra rapes her, accidentally suffocating her while caught up in his sadism. However, following this, there is a supernatural change in Bulbbul — she comes back with a mission to help the women in the village fight back against injustice. She goes through a symbolic transformation each time, represented by a blood red moon, which indicates that the goddess Kali had given her  a chance to return to fight back. She begins to punish the men who abuse and murder their wives or take advantage of other girls by killing them though the villagers think those as doings of the chudail, who is distinguished by her backward feet. It is also revealed that she killed Mahendra following this transformation as punishment for raping her.

At present time, Satya is seen to escort Sudip to Calcutta on the suspicion of being the murderer. On the way, the driver of the carriage (the man Bulbbul was previously informed of) is killed by the chudail, making Satya realize that Sudip is innocent. He shoots the chudail woman, mortally wounding her. As he escapes the carriage, Sudip finds Bulbbul, realizing and accepting her as the chudail. During a brawl with Sudip, Satya unintentionally sets the forest on fire. He realises that Bulbbul is the chudail when Sudip shouts for her. Upon realizing this, Satya cries in agony, while Bulbbul who was trying to escape, takes refuge on a tree and watches everything around her burn before she is slowly engulfed by the flames.

A year later, Indranil returns to his empty estate. He discovers that Satya has departed, as he, guilt-ridden for what had happened with Bulbbul, had felt that he too was becoming like his brothers. That night, Indranil is awoken from his sleep by Bulbbul, who emerges from embers and smirks at him, hinting that she kills him as revenge.

Cast 
 Tripti Dimri as Bulbbul, a former child-bride who secretly fights against the injustice females face in her village.
 Avinash Tiwary as Satya, Indranil's younger brother and Bulbbul's childhood friend with whom she is in love.
 Paoli Dam as Binodini, Mahendra's widowed wife.
 Rahul Bose as Indranil, Bulbbul's husband whom she married at 5 years of age.
 Parambrata Chattopadhyay as Dr. Sudip, a local doctor who regularly checks up on Bulbbul's mutilated feet.

Production
The story of the movie was written by Anvita Dutt, who has been a commissioned writer for films. She wrote the first two pages of the story after awaking from her sleep one night and outlined the chudail and the myth and idea behind her in this first draft. She completed the rest of the story after returning from a trip from Kolkata, after seeing a bulbul make a nest outside her house and after some encouragement from her colleagues. She intended the story to resemble a fairy tale and set it in the neoclassical era of Bengal to fulfill that. She was also inspired by Rabindranath Tagore's portrayal of women; Binodini is the name of one of the characters in his work. The premise has similarities with Tagore's novella Nastanirh, which was adapted by Satyajit Ray as the 1964 film Charulata. Dutt describes, "Now in reality what happens to women is much worse. The emotional, the physical and the psychological abuse is much, much worse. In telling of the story, I chose to tell it this way. I wanted the cold rage of women to find an outlet... It's a tragedy. The story is set 200 years ago but it's still relevant."

The film was shot over a period of thirty-three days in locations near Kolkata and Mumbai. Siddharth Diwan led the cinematography. With inputs from Dutt, the artwork of Raja Ravi Varma and Caravaggio were used as inspiration, in addition to influences from Expressionism and Surrealism. Diwan also took inspiration from photographers like Man Ray and Raja Deen Dayal. Satyajit Ray's poster of the film Devi was an inspiration for the lighting. Some examples of symbolism used include the grass, kaash phool, the bird and flower motifs, all significant to the goddess Durga. The mansion has previously featured in the film Chokher Bali by Rituparno Ghosh.

Themes
Set in the late 18th century in Bengal, the film delves into the idea of aristocratic Bengali women embracing ideologies of freedom.  Aruna Chakravarti's Jorasanko described Tagore's relationship with his child-bride sister-in-law, Kadambari, which Shreya Paul of Firstpost noted as the foundation behind the relationship between Bulbbul and Satya. Chakravarti described how Kadambari was devastated when she was separated from Tagore (due to his marriage). Further, Tagore's older brother, Birendranath, suffered from a mental illness but was still married off and abused his wife, similar to Binodini being married off to Mahender.

Aditya Mani Jha of Firstpost noted that the film is "a postmodern example of the Gothic genre", the most common example of which is Bram Stoker's Dracula. Satya is similar to Jonathan Harker, the protagonist of Dracula, in that they have the same "cold, unemotional logic" that leads them to investigate the case (much like Sherlock Holmes) and eventually decide to kill the monster themselves. The supernatural element (chudail in this case) embodying repressed emotions or desires is a trope of the Gothic genre. Bulbbul's reveal as the chudail frames her like a goddess, specifically like Kali. Binodini subtly planting the idea of Bulbbul and Satya in Indranil's head makes her like Iago.

Reception  
Bulbbul opened up to generally positive  reception from the critics and the audience with a particular praise for its stand on feminism, visual effects, background music, and performance of the leads, especially Tripti Dimri.

Shubhra Gupta of The Indian Express stated: "Bulbbul is very much its own film, the mix of classic pre-Renaissance Bengal and desi horror gothic making for gripping viewing... It is a powerfully feminist, revisionist tale of a woman wronged, and it is told with economy, precision and feeling...Dutt uses the ancient trope of a bloodthirsty 'chudail with ultey pair', a familiar creature tale in our scary 'kisse-kahaani', to create dread and fear. The writing is skilful and stays on point, and the performances are all solid."

Namrata Joshi of The Hindu applauded the rebellious idea of Dutt and stated: "Anvita Dutt mixes the feudal with the supernatural, the spooky, the mythological and the fablesque in a thoughtful, moving and engaging manner....She mixes the feudal with the supernatural and the spooky, the mythological and the fablesque to strike at the putrid core of patriarchy in a thoughtful, moving, engaging and powerful manner."

Rohan Naahar of Hindustan Times reviewed the film as over-directed but underwritten. He wrote that the characters are thinly written and the surprises are carelessly telegraphed and a weak script let down the film in spite of visually striking imagery.

Baradwaj Rangan of Film Companion South wrote "What we’re left with is a fever-dreamscape quasi-giallo movie, which transforms the pulp premise of a female vigilante...into something very human and emotional and deeply mysterious...the film’s imagery may be teasingly ambiguous, but the "hell hath no fury" messaging couldn't be clearer".

Shubhram Kulkarni of Koimoi gave it 3.5 stars and stated "As much as I am in love with Anvita Dutt as the writer, her direction is point one below. As observed, while the script tries to keep the big reveal hidden, the direction and dialogue make it predictable. Thus making the climax less hitting."

Stutee Ghosh of The Quint gave it 3 stars and mentioned "One of the questions that the film throws up and doesn't answer is if the binary between being a devi or a chudail is the only recourse that feminine power has to navigate in this patriarchal set up."

Kritika Vaid of India.com mentioned the universally positive reaction of the audience in social media. Veteran Director Anurag Kashyap tweeted and called the film one of the best he had seen in this millennium and also praised the performance by the lead actors and Anvita Dutt.

Sameer Sulunkhe of Cineblitz rated it as 2.5 stars and observed "The film is a celebration of colors – red hues symbolizing anger, celebration, menstruation and above all womanhood, stark blue representing the grim past. Adding to this visual spectacle is Amit Trivedi’s hauntingly beautiful score, dominated by violin. It’s a great combination of audio-visual storytelling. What hurts Bulbbul is its writing. Writer-director Anvita Dutt has tremendous command over the language, and the dialogues have a literary touch (no surprise as it is set in Tagore’s Bengal), but the overall narrative lacks novelty and doesn’t have much impact either. "

Accolades

References

External links 
 

2020 films
Hindi-language Netflix original films
Indian direct-to-video films
Hindi-language horror films
Films set in West Bengal
Films set in 1881
Films set in 1901
2020 direct-to-video films
Indian supernatural thriller films
Indian ghost films
2020 thriller films